is a 2019 Japanese dark fantasy action horror film, and the sequel of the 2017 film Tokyo Ghoul, based on Sui Ishida's manga series Tokyo Ghoul. It was released theatrically in Japan by Shochiku on July 19, 2019. The film has grossed over ¥220 million in Japan, and received mixed reviews from critics.

Plot
After the murder of the model Margaret by Shuu Tsukiyama, a murderous ghoul with epicurean desires, Tsukiyama arrives at Anteiku and approaches Ken Kaneki. Tsukiyama befriends Kaneki, and desires to eat him. Tsukiyama invites Kaneki to the ghoul restaurant, where Kaneki is captured, to be consumed by other ghouls. However, after Tsukiyama's discovery of Kaneki's ghoul eye, and a raid by the CCG, Kaneki escapes alive.

Kaneki meets Kimi Nishino, a human and girlfriend of Nishiki Nishio, who was previously injured by attackers. Nishino is later kidnapped by Tsukiyama, who later demands to eat Kaneki while Kaneki is eating Nishino. Nishio and Touka Kirishima, however, retaliate against Tsukiyama, and free Nishino. Kirishima also intended to kill Nishino due to her being a human knowing the identities of ghouls, however, after Nishino compliments Kirishima's kagune, Kirishima spares her.

Cast
 Masataka Kubota as Ken Kaneki
 Maika Yamamoto as Touka Kirishima
 Shota Matsuda as Shuu Tsukiyama
 Nobuyuki Suzuki as Kōtarō Amon
 Kai Ogasawara as Hideyoshi "Hide" Nagachika
 Shunya Shiraishi as Nishiki Nishio
 Mai Kiryū as Kimi Nishino
 Hiyori Sakurada as Hinami Fueguchi
 Kunio Murai as Yoshimura
 Minosuke Bandō as Uta
 Shuntarō Yanagi as Renji Yomo
 Nana Mori as Yoriko Kosaka
 Jiyoung as Itori
 Maggy as Margaret
 Mackenyu as Sōta

Production
On September 20, 2018, Shochiku teased news about the live-action Tokyo Ghoul film onto its YouTube channel, before formally announcing on September 21, 2018, that a second film was green-lit for a 2019 release under the title "Tokyo Ghoul 2". It was also revealed that Maika Yamamoto would replace Fumika Shimizu as Touka Kirishima after the latter's retirement from acting in 2017. On December 19, 2018, the official website for the film revealed a shot from the film, and the July 19 release date for the film.

On April 11, 2019, the title of the film was announced as Tokyo Ghoul S, and a trailer and theatrical poster for the film was released. On May 28, 2019, the first 150 seconds of the film was released on Shochiku's YouTube channel.

The theme song was revealed at the premiere of the film in Tokyo at June 1, 2019. Queen Bee performs the theme song "Introduction".

Release
Tokyo Ghoul S premiered in Tokyo on June 11, 2019, and in Osaka on June 24, 2019. The film screened theatrically across Japan from July 19, 2019.

Funimation licensed the film for the United States and Canada, and premiered the film in the US at Anime Expo 2019 in Los Angeles on July 6, 2019, and in Canada at Fantasia Festival in Montreal on July 30, 2019. Funimation later provided a wider screening of the film on September 16, 2019. In Australia and New Zealand, Madman Entertainment licensed the film and released the film theatrically from July 25, 2019.

Reception

Box office
In its opening weekend, Tokyo Ghoul S ranked 7th at the Japanese box office.

Critical reception

References

External links
  
 

2010s Japanese films
2010s Japanese-language films
Films set in Tokyo
Films set in universities and colleges
Films shot in Tokyo
Funimation
Live-action films based on manga
Shochiku films
Tokyo Ghoul